"I Only Lie When I Love You" is a song by English hard rock band Royal Blood, released as the second overall single from their second studio album How Did We Get So Dark? on June 8, 2017.

The song was written by the band and was produced by Jolyon Thomas and Tom Dalgety with Royal Blood. It reached number one on the Billboard Mainstream Rock chart and number sixteen on the Billboard Alternative Songs chart, becoming the band's second-most successful single on the latter chart.

Promotion 
The track was released as the third overall single from the band's second album How Did We Get So Dark? released on June 8, 2017. It was later serviced to U.S. rock radio formats as the second U.S. radio single on October 3, 2017.

Music video 
The music video for "I Only Lie When I Love You" was released on June 8, 2017 and was directed by Pascal Teixeira. It features the band performing on a white backdrop and a rolling shot that features distorted angles of the band.

Personnel
Mike Kerr – vocals, bass, keyboards, production
Ben Thatcher – drums, percussion, piano, production
Jolyon Thomas – production, engineering
Drew Bang – engineering
Tom Dalgety – mixing

Charts

Weekly charts

Year-end charts

References

External links
"I Only Lie When I Love You" music video on YouTube

2017 songs
2017 singles
Royal Blood (band) songs
Warner Records singles
Song recordings produced by Tom Dalgety